The 1987–88 season was the 42nd season in Rijeka's history and their 26th season in the Yugoslav First League. Their 4th place finish in the 1986–87 season meant it was their 14th successive season playing in the Yugoslav First League.

Competitions

Yugoslav First League

Results summary

Results by round

Matches

First League

Source: rsssf.com

Yugoslav Cup

Source: rsssf.com

Squad statistics
Competitive matches only.  Appearances in brackets indicate numbers of times the player came on as a substitute.

Notes
1. Data for league attendance in most cases reflects the number of sold tickets and may not be indicative of the actual attendance.

See also
1987–88 Yugoslav First League
1987–88 Yugoslav Cup

References

External links
 1987–88 Yugoslav First League at rsssf.com
 Prvenstvo 1987.-88. at nk-rijeka.hr

HNK Rijeka seasons
Rijeka